The Palmaille is a famous avenue of Altona, Hamburg. It is considered one of northern Europe's most complete examples of a Neoclassical urban ensemble.

First developed in the 1630s as a lane for the then popular palle-maille, in the course of the 18th century the Palmaille became Altona's most sought-after address. At the time, the town of Altona was part of the Duchy of Holstein being in personal union with the Kingdom of Denmark, and Danish monarchs promoted it as a fierce economic rival to Hamburg. The wealthy merchant families of Altona had their stately palaces built by Christian Frederik Hansen (1756–1845), then Director of the Royal Danish Academy of Arts and Royal Danish master-builder for the Duchy of Holstein; later also by his nephew Johann Matthias Hansen (1786–1825). Some of the buildings were hit during World War II, but could be rebuilt according to Hansen's original drawings.

References

External links 

Streets in Hamburg
Altona, Hamburg
Neoclassical architecture in Germany